Mirificarma pederskoui is a moth of the family Gelechiidae. It was described by Peter Huemer and Ole Karsholt in 1999. It is found in southern Spain.

References

Moths described in 1999
Mirificarma
Moths of Europe